The 1946 Florida Gators football team was an American football team that represented the University of Florida in the Southeastern Conference (SEC) during the 1946 college football season. In their first season under head coach Raymond Wolf, the Gators compiled a 0–9 record (0–5 against SEC opponents), finished last in the SEC, and were outscored by a total of 264 to 104.

The winless 0–9 season is the worst win–loss record in the history of Gators football to date, surpassing the winless 0–5 record of the 1916 Florida Gators football team. Despite the poor overall showing, Broughton Williams led the nation with 490 receiving yards. Harold Griffin led the nation in punt return average. Griffin had the longest punt return of the year, a 97-yard return against Miami (FL), and 92-yard return against Villanova.

The 1946 season was at the center of a school record 13-game losing streak which stretched from the last game of the 1945 campaign until the fourth contest of 1947. The players on these squads dubbed their time at Florida the "Golden Era", and members of the "Golden Era Gang" regularly held reunions and raised funds for scholarships and facilities improvements at UF for many subsequent years. Players on these teams included future Florida attorney general James W. Kynes and College Football Hall of Fame coach Marcelino Huerta.

Schedule

References

Florida
Florida Gators football seasons
College football winless seasons
Florida Gators football